Think About Mutation (TAM) was a crossover band from Germany. They were together for about 10 years (1992-2002) and in their early days set a landmark by mixing up house music elements and heavy guitars. Their progressive sound made them a big influence to modern electronic music as well
as to the guitar scene. The band released 5 albums and 6 singles. 
In 2006, two ex-members of the band formed a new project, called The Sonic Boom Foundation.

Discography
Motorrazor (Dynamica 1993) 
Housebastards (Dynamica 1994) 
Hellraver (Dynamica 1996)
Virus (Motor / Universal 1997)
Highlife (Motor / Universal 1999)
Two Tribes (Motor / Universal 1999) — Promotional album for Command & Conquer: Tiberian Sun, containing the cover of Two Tribes from the Highlife album, two other songs, and a CD data track with their video clip of Two Tribes. A free promotional version of this album was also released, containing only the titular track.

External links
Official website
[ Allmusic]
MusicMight biography (archived)
Complete discography
The Sonic Boom Foundation

German electronic music groups
Music in Leipzig
German industrial music groups